A hot cross bun is a spiced sweet bun.

Hot Cross Buns may also refer to:

Hot Cross Buns (film), a Channel 101 and YouTube internet video
"Hot Cross Buns" (song), a nursery rhyme

See also
 Hot Cross Bunny, a 1948 Warner Bros. Merrie Melodies theatrical animated short